Darmstadt is a city in the Bundesland (federal state) of Hesse in the Federal Republic of Germany.

Darmstadt may also refer to:
 Darmstadt (region), a German governmental region in Hesse.
 Darmstadt-Dieburg, a district in Hesse, Germany.
 Darmstadt, Indiana, a town in Vanderburgh County, Indiana, United States.
 Darmstadt, Illinois, a town in St. Clair County, Illinois, United States.
 SV Darmstadt 98, a football club in Darmstadt, Germany.
 the Darmstadt meteorite, which fell in Hesse, Germany before 1804 (see meteorite falls).
 the Darmstädter Ferienkurse, or Darmstadt International Summer Courses for New Music.
 the Darmstadt School, a style of musical composition prevalent in the 1950s.
 "Darmstadt" (song), the single by the Finnish band Ruoska.
 Darmstadt slide rule
 241418 Darmstadt, an asteroid.

See also 
 Landgraviate of Hesse-Darmstadt
 Grand Duchy of Hesse
 People's State of Hesse
 Prince George of Darmstadt (1669–1705)